Romance/Romance is a musical with a book and lyrics by Barry Harman and music by Keith Herrmann.

The show is composed of two acts linked only by the common theme of love and one song performed in both acts. The first, The Little Comedy, is based on a short story by Arthur Schnitzler and explores the budding relationship between two people who have adopted personas other than their own. Set in late 19th century Vienna, it focuses on Josefine, a demimondaine weary of the social life provided by her upper class lovers, and wealthy playboy Alfred, who has tired of a seemingly endless round of inconsequential affairs. She assumes the guise of a working class woman, while he pretends to be a struggling poet, and the two meet while enjoying their new identities. Whether or not they can survive a weekend in the country with their usually glamorous trappings replaced by inedible food, bad wine, swarming insects, and total boredom is the question to be answered.

Summer Share, the second act based on Jules Renard's 1898 play Le pain de ménage, is updated to the late 1980s and set in The Hamptons, where two married couples in their thirties are spending the season in a rented cottage. Sam, who is married to Barb, and Monica, who is married to Lenny, find themselves gradually progressing from harmless flirtation to the serious possibility of an illicit affair.

Initially staged off-off-Broadway in 1987 at the Actor's Outlet Theatre (Executive Director: Eleanor Segan, Artistic Director: Ken Lowstetter), Romance/Romance garnered critical notices that encouraged the move to a larger house uptown. After thirteen previews, the Broadway production, directed by Harman and choreographed by Pamela Sousa, opened on May 1, 1988 at the Helen Hayes Theatre, where it ran for 297 performances. The cast included Alison Fraser as Josefine/Monica, Scott Bakula as Alfred/Sam, Deborah Graham as Barb, and Robert Hoshour as Lenny. Sal Viviano was the Standby for Bakula and Hoshour, and succeeded Bakula, when he left the Show.  Jana Robbins was the Standby for Fraser and Graham. Barry Williams replaced Viviano later in the run.

An original cast recording was released by MCA.

Songs

Act I      
 The Little Comedy
 Goodbye, Emil
 It's Not Too Late
 Great News
 Oh, What a Performance!
 I'll Always Remember the Song
 Happy, Happy, Happy
 Women of Vienna
 Yes, It's Love
 A Rustic Country Inn
 The Night It Had to End
 The Little Comedy (Finale)

Act II      
 Summer Share
 Think of the Odds
 It's Not Too Late (Reprise)
 Plans A & B
 Let's Not Talk About It
 So Glad I Married Her
 Small Craft Warnings
 How Did I End Up Here?
 Words He Doesn't Say
 My Love for You
 Moonlight Passing Through a Window
 Now
 Romantic Notions
 Romance, Romance

Awards and nominations

Original Broadway production

External links
 

1987 musicals
Broadway musicals
Musicals based on plays
Musicals based on short fiction